Snowshoe Lake may refer to:

Canada 
 Snowshoe Lake (Bark Lake, Ontario)
 Snowshoe Lake (Cripple Creek, Ontario)
 Snowshoe Lake (Frontenac County)
 Snowshoe Lake (Kenora District)
 Snowshoe Lake (Kimikong River, Ontario)
 Snowshoe Lake (West Harry Lake, Ontario), in Algonquin Park
 Snowshoe Lake (Magnetawan River, Ontario)
 Snowshoe Lake (Temagami), Nipissing District, Ontario
 Snowshoe Lake (Thunder Bay District)

United States 
Snowshoe Lake (Montana)